The 1972 Golden Gate Pacific Coast Classic, also known as the Pacific Coast Championships, was a men's tennis tournament played on outdoor hard courts at the Golden Gate Fields in Albany, California in the United States. The event was part of Group C of the 1972 Commercial Union Assurance Grand Prix circuit. It was the 82nd edition of the tournament and ran from September 25 through October 1, 1972. Jimmy Connors won the singles title and earned $8,000 first-prize money.

Finals

Singles
 Jimmy Connors defeated  Roscoe Tanner 6–2, 7–6(5–3)
 It was Connors' 6th singles title of the year and of his career.

Doubles
 Frew McMillan /  Bob Hewitt defeated  Björn Borg /  Ove Nils Bengtson 6–2, 2–6, 6–2

References

1972 Grand Prix (tennis)
1972
1972 in American tennis
1972 in sports in California
September 1972 sports events in the United States
October 1972 sports events in the United States